Sun Jun (born 4 January 1975) is a Chinese rower. He competed in the men's coxless four event at the 1996 Summer Olympics.

References

1975 births
Living people
Chinese male rowers
Olympic rowers of China
Rowers at the 1996 Summer Olympics
Place of birth missing (living people)
Asian Games medalists in rowing
Rowers at the 1994 Asian Games
Rowers at the 1998 Asian Games
Asian Games gold medalists for China
Medalists at the 1994 Asian Games
Medalists at the 1998 Asian Games
20th-century Chinese people
21st-century Chinese people